Aleksandr Vladimirovich Melnik (11 June 1958, Chervonopartyzansk – 8 September 2021) was a Russian film director.

Career
Melnik graduated from Odessa Hydrometeorological Institute, and worked for a time as a journalist and publisher. He was a member of the Guild of Russian Filmmakers. 

He was the father of film producer Anton Melnik.

Death
Melnik died at the Kitabo-Oron waterfall (Big Irkindinsky waterfall), located in the western part of the Putorana Nature Reserve, 120 km from Norilsk, together with the head of the Ministry of Emergency Situations Yevgeny Zinichev during the scouting of a filming location. Melnik slipped and fell off a cliff into the water. Zinichev died after he dove off the cliff to save Melnik, according to the ministry.

Filmography
Terra Nova (Новая Земля, Novaya Zemlya): film director, screenwriter and producer
Territory (Территория, Territoriya): film director

References

1958 births
2021 deaths
People from Chervonopartyzansk
Russian film directors
Russian screenwriters
Soviet journalists
Accidental deaths from falls